The men's middleweight (75 kg/165 lbs) Low-Kick division at the W.A.K.O. European Championships 2004 in Budva was the fifth heaviest of the male Low-Kick tournaments and involved eight fighters.  Each of the matches was three rounds of two minutes each and were fought under Low-Kick kickboxing rules.

The tournament was won by Russia's Dmitri Krasichkov who defeated France's Fouad Ezbiri in the gold medal match by split decision.  Stefano Paone from Italy and Vesko Dukic from hosts Serbia and Montenegro were rewarded for making the semi finals by gaining bronze medals.

Results

Key

See also
List of WAKO Amateur European Championships
List of WAKO Amateur World Championships
List of male kickboxers

References

External links
 WAKO World Association of Kickboxing Organizations Official Site

W.A.K.O. European Championships 2004 (Budva)